Intra-household bargaining refers to negotiations that occur between members of a household in order to arrive at decisions regarding the household unit, like whether to spend or save, whether to study or work.

Bargaining is traditionally defined in economic terms of negotiating conditions of a purchase or contract and is sometimes used in place of direct monetary exchange. Bargaining process within a family is one of the important aspects of family economics. Bargaining also plays a role in the functioning and decision making of households, where agreements and decisions do not often have direct monetary values and affect various members of the household.

Household dynamics
The household is traditionally described as a single economic unit that "works as a group for its own good", meaning all members of the household contribute in an altruistic manner towards the benefit and functioning of the entire household. The household is "the basic residential unit in which economic production, consumption, inheritance, child rearing, and shelter are organized and carried out". Though it is not always synonymous with family, in the case of intra-household bargaining, in which members of the household are considered to be one unit, the household is generally synonymous.

Because a household is composed of various individuals, conflicts of interest arise. These conflicts of interest make bargaining a necessary fact of household life and create a household environment that is not universally governed by altruism. These conflicts of interest have the potential to create a spectrum of intra-household dynamics, ranging from a non-cooperative to a cooperative household (which is directly reflective of game theoretic bargaining models). In the non-cooperative model, each household member acts in order to maximize his or her own utility; in the cooperative model, households act as a unit to "maximize the welfare of their members" (described above as altruism).

Bargaining power
Bargaining power is "the relative capacity of each of the parties to a negotiation or dispute to compel or secure agreements on its own terms". In other words, "if both parties are on equal footing in a debate, then they will have equal bargaining power", and, conversely, if one party has an advantageous position in the debate, the parties have unequal bargaining power.

More specifically, what determines the equality or inequality of bargaining power is the relative fallback positions or "threat points" of the individuals in the bargaining process; that is, which bargainer has more to lose (economically, socially, etc.)? In the context of intra-household bargaining, an individual's bargaining power and fallback position are defined by one's ability to survive and thrive outside the family.

Factors that determine fallback positions

Extra-household parameters 
The structural support, whether institutional or societal, an individual has outside of the household determines how capable one would be of surviving outside the household.

 Individual's rights/access to communal resources: Communal resources are entities such as village commons or public forests from which individuals and households alike may acquire resources (e.g., firewood or water) that are necessary for daily subsistence.
 Existence of social support systems (see also social networks): Social support systems are friendship, familial, caste, and any other social groupings from which one derives emotional support, benefiting the individual's overall health and increasing their ability to survive well outside of the household.
 Support from the state and non-governmental organizations (NGOs): State and NGO support could increase an individual's intra-household bargaining power by the creation of a social safety net. The work of states, NGOs, and a social safety net can increase "access to employment, assets, credit, infrastructure, etc".
Social norms and "perceptions about needs, contributions, and other determinants of deservedness": The social acceptability (or lack thereof) of leaving the household or living in a non-traditional household, the perceived social needs of individuals within the household, and the low valuation of certain tasks, such as care work, all regulate the bargaining power an individual has within the household, because these factors directly impact the individual's ability to survive outside the household.

Individual assets 
The access one has to individual assets, both economic (such as property, land, wealth, or earning ability) and personal (such as labor), determines fallback position because it is directly linked to one's capability of surviving outside the household.

In South Asian societies land is one of the most valuable individual assets that can increase an individual's bargaining power, yet it is more uncommon and difficult for women to own land than men for a number of reasons: inheritance laws that allow women to inherit land are not strongly enforced, in order to own land individuals must obtain a certain level of education, which women have traditionally not had access to, and owning land and enforcing laws depends upon one's "economic and physical access to legal machinery" as well as access to government officials. Due to the unequal gender rights to land ownership, South Asian women are less capable of providing income to the household which lessens their bargaining power in the household.

In some societies, there is a custom of housewife hidden savings as a counter to inequality.

Social norms and gender perceptions 
Due to the traditional role of women in South Asia as caretakers in the household rather than workers bringing an income to the household, women are not socially perceived as deserving of more opportunities because worth correlates with wealth and not the quality or amount of work one has done.

Inequalities in bargaining power 
Unequal access to strong fallback positions creates a situation in which different individuals within the household have more or less bargaining power, and therefore have more or less influence over household decision-making. When considering the factors that determine fallback position in intra-household bargaining and what populations have access to positive fallback positions, Bina Agarwal's research in rural South Asian communities shows that their women have less access to strong bargaining power and their interests are not reflected in household decisions.

Game theory
Within the household unit and in the mathematical study of game theory, scholars have defined two distinct types of bargaining: cooperative and non-cooperative. In cooperative bargaining models (also called collaborative decision making), the outcomes of negotiations are more equally beneficial to all members of the household, and have therefore been considered a more "natural" means of analyzing the family unit in comparison to non-cooperative models. In non-cooperative bargaining models (also called unitary decision making), personal interests motivate individuals within the household rather than the desire to work in a collaborative manner and maximize the benefit of all household members.

See also

 Capability approach
 Care work
 Conflict of interest
 Cooperative game
 Feminist economics
 Feminization of poverty
 Gender inequality
 Shared earning/shared parenting marriage
 Sibling rivalry
 Work–family balance in the United States

References

Family economics
Feminist economics
Bargaining theory